Péter Bonifert (born 4 July 1985 in Budapest) is a Hungarian football player who currently plays for DSV Leoben.

References
HLSZ 
MLSZ 

1985 births
Living people
Footballers from Budapest
Hungarian footballers
Association football forwards
MTK Budapest FC players
BFC Siófok players
Szombathelyi Haladás footballers
Szigetszentmiklósi TK footballers
DSV Leoben players
Nemzeti Bajnokság I players
Hungarian expatriate footballers
Expatriate footballers in Austria
Hungarian expatriate sportspeople in Austria